Studley Roger is a small village and civil parish in the Harrogate district of North Yorkshire, England, and it is about 1 mile west of the historical market town of Ripon. The population of the civil parish was 175 at the 2011 Census. Neighbouring the village of Studley Roger is Studley Royal Park which contains the remains of Fountains Abbey and is a World Heritage Site.

The word stōd, means a stud, where horses are kept. lēah, a forest, Wood, Glade or Clearing.

Studley Roger and the surrounding area
 Studley Roger is located a mile west of the market town of Ripon. To the south west in the local area of Studley Roger is Studley Royal Park, which contains the ruins of Fountains Abbey. Studley Park and the Fountains Abbey is now a UNESCO world heritage site, it is considered an area of outstanding beauty

 "A striking landscape was created around the ruins of the Cistercian Fountains Abbey and Fountains Hall Castle, in Yorkshire. The 18th-century landscaping, gardens and canal, the 19th-century plantations and vistas, and the neo-Gothic castle of Studley Royal Park, make this an outstanding site."

Within Studley Roger itself there are no registered businesses, however there is a small family run bedsit inside the village called Lawrence House which is small and ideal for weekend visits and honeymoons, with the owners providing great local knowledge. 

 "A peaceful place in a supreme position"

Studley Roger Does also lack in any local amenities, the village has no school so students head in the local town of Ripon for their education. The parish also lacks a church and pub in the area. Meaning Fountains abbey is the main attraction for visitors to the village.

Population
According to the 2011 census Studley Rogers total population was 175 people. The population has fluctuated over the years with a notable increase in population from the 1950s. But has however stayed in a small population size, however notable during the wars the population drops. You can also say that the recent drop in population would also match the national trend of people moving out of rural areas and into urban ones. The census data also shows the population of Studley Roger to have a population in every age group, also in the different brackets of economic activity, with economically active full-time persons being the highest among the population of Studley Roger. Studley Roger currently has ten students aged four and over. Showing that Studley Roger has a high age average being 45. with many older working professionals, and an ageing population in the local area.

References

External links

Villages in North Yorkshire
Civil parishes in North Yorkshire